Boronia Road (in its easternmost part Forest Road) is a major urban arterial road in the eastern suburbs of Melbourne, Victoria, Australia.

Major intersections

|}

References

Highways and freeways in Melbourne
Transport in the City of Whitehorse
Transport in the City of Knox